Markus Wagesreiter (born 14 January 1982) is an Austrian handball player for SG West Wien and the Austrian national team.

References

1982 births
Living people
Austrian male handball players
People from Sankt Pölten
Sportspeople from Lower Austria